Hard is a surname. Notable people with the surname include:

Darlene Hard (1936–2021), American tennis player
James Hard, American Civil War soldier
Leif Hård (born 1944), Swedish politician
Peggy Hård, Swedish clerk